Bainbridge (population approximately 337) is a locality in British Columbia. Its elevation is 5,395 ft.

External links

References

Populated places in the Alberni-Clayoquot Regional District
Ghost towns in British Columbia
Unincorporated settlements in British Columbia
Alberni Valley